Clear Hills County is a municipal district in north western Alberta, Canada. It is located in Census Division 17.

In 1950, the massive Chinchaga fire burned through much of the region.

On January 1, 2006, the name was changed from Municipal District of Clear Hills No. 21 to Clear Hills County.

Geography

Communities and localities 
 
The following urban municipalities are surrounded by Clear Hills County.
Cities
none
Towns
none
Villages
Hines Creek
Summer villages
none

The following hamlets are located within Clear Hills County.
Hamlets
Cleardale
Worsley

The following localities are located within Clear Hills County.
Localities 
Bear Canyon
Cherry Point
Clear Prairie
Deer Hill
Eureka River
Marina
Peace Grove
Royce
Other places
Doig

Demographics 

In the 2016 Census of Population conducted by Statistics Canada, Clear Hills County had a population of 3,023 living in 938 of its 1,062 total private dwellings, a  change from its 2011 population of 2,801.

Clear Hills County's 2012 municipal census counted a population of 2,829, a 4.7% decrease over its 2008 municipal census population of 2,970.

See also 
List of communities in Alberta
List of municipal districts in Alberta

References

External links 

 
Municipal districts in Alberta